Giacomo Antonio Cortuso (1513–1603) was an Italian botanist.

1513 births
1603 deaths
16th-century Italian botanists